Bashiru Gambo (born 24 September 1978) is a Ghanaian footballer who played as a forward for Black Stars. He currently resides in the United States.

References

External links

1978 births
Living people
Footballers from Kumasi
Association football forwards
Ghanaian footballers
Ghana under-20 international footballers
Ghana international footballers
Expatriate footballers in Germany
Expatriate footballers in Morocco
Borussia Dortmund players
Borussia Dortmund II players
Karlsruher SC players
SSV Reutlingen 05 players
Stuttgarter Kickers players
FC Erzgebirge Aue players
SSV Jahn Regensburg players
Accra Hearts of Oak S.C. players
Bundesliga players
2. Bundesliga players
3. Liga players
Ghanaian expatriate sportspeople in Germany
Ghanaian expatriate sportspeople in Morocco